This was the first edition of the tournament.

Ariel Behar and Enrique López Pérez won the title after Dan Evans and Gerard Granollers withdrew before the final.

Seeds

Draw

References
 Main Draw

Rafa Nadal Open Banc Sabadell - Doubles